Bobby Stojanov Varga (Macedonian: Боби Стојанов Варга) is a Macedonian painter. He was born 8 November 1972 in Veles. He holds a master's degree in painting at Ss. Cyril and Methodius University of Skopje, in the class of Professor Simon Shemov with a specialty in handmade paper.

Varga has had eight personal exhibitions in Macedonia and over 80 group exhibitions in Macedonia and abroad.
Since 2005, Varga has been the owner of Custom Airbrush VARGA studio, working on custom painting of motorcycles, cars, guitars, and computers.

References

Razlikite obedinuvaat: Proekt na Društvoto na likovnite umetnici na Veles i Naroden muzej - Veles. "Razlikite obedinuvaat", pečatnica "Sofija", Veles, 27 May 2003.

1972 births
Living people
Macedonian painters
Macedonian contemporary artists
People from Veles, North Macedonia
Ss. Cyril and Methodius University of Skopje alumni